Dylan Gaither (born August 13, 2000) is an American college soccer player who plays for the Mercer Bears in the NCAA Division I.

Career 
Gaither played with Atlanta United FC academy whilst also appearing for Atlanta's United Soccer League affiliate Atlanta United 2 during their inaugural season in 2018.

References

External links

2000 births
Living people
American soccer players
Association football midfielders
Atlanta United 2 players
USL Championship players
Soccer players from Georgia (U.S. state)
Mercer Bears men's soccer players
Sportspeople from Augusta, Georgia